Speokokosia is a genus of ground beetles in the family Carabidae. This genus has a single species, Speokokosia corneti. It is found in the Democratic Republic of the Congo.

References

Platyninae
Endemic fauna of the Democratic Republic of the Congo